

Hereditary Prince of Modena

See also

Dukes of Modena

 
House of Este
Dukes of Modena